Passmore Auxiliary Field is a former facility of the United States Army Air Forces located in Prattville, Alabama. Constructed after 1941 as an auxiliary to the nearby Maxwell Field, it was turned back into farmland after the war.

See also 

 Alabama World War II Army Airfields
 List of airports in Alabama

References

Airfields of the United States Army Air Forces in Alabama
Transportation buildings and structures in Autauga County, Alabama
Closed installations of the United States Army